

This is a list of properties and historic districts in Nevada that are listed on the National Register of Historic Places. There is at least one listing in each of Nevada's 16 counties and one independent city.

Current listings by county

The following are approximate tallies of current listings by county. These counts are based on entries in the National Register Information Database as of April 24, 2008 and new weekly listings posted since then on the National Register of Historic Places web site. There are frequent additions to the listings and occasional delistings and the counts here are approximate and not official. New entries are added to the official Register on a weekly basis.  Also, the counts in this table exclude boundary increase and decrease listings which only modify the area covered by an existing property or district, although carrying a separate National Register reference number.

References

External links

Nevada listings at nationalregisterofhistoricplaces.com
Three Historic Nevada Cities: Carson City, Reno, Virginia City - details about more than 60 National Register properties
Stewart Indian School

 
NRHP
NRHP
Nevada